Gaslight is an upcoming Indian Hindi-language mystery-thriller film, directed by Pavan Kirpalani and produced by Ramesh Taurani and Akshai Puri. The film stars Sara Ali Khan, Vikrant Massey 
and Chitrangada Singh. It is scheduled to be released on 31 March 2023, on Disney+ Hotstar.

Cast
 Sara Ali Khan as Meesha
 Vikrant Massey as Kapil 
 Chitrangada Singh as Rukmani
 Akshay Oberoi
 Rahul Dev

Production
The principal photography commenced in February 2022 in Rajkot and completed in just 36 days.

Release 
TBA

References

External links
 
 

Disney+ Hotstar original films
2023 films
2020s mystery thriller films
Indian mystery thriller films
2020s Hindi-language films